Quế Ngọc Mạnh (born 28 March 1990) is a Vietnamese professional footballer who is a defender for Công An Nhân Dân.

Ngọc Mạnh is the elder brother of footballer Quế Ngọc Hải.

Honours
Công An Nhân Dân
V.League 2: 2022

References

1990 births
Living people
Vietnamese footballers
Hoa people
People from Nghệ An province
Song Lam Nghe An FC players
Can Tho FC players
V.League 1 players
Association football defenders